Shuhrat Razzaqov is a musician from Uzbekistan. She mainly plays the dutar and tambur but also other folk instruments from Central Asia.

References

Uzbekistani musicians
Living people
Year of birth missing (living people)